Hill Creek is a stream in the U.S. state of Oregon. It empties into Emigrant Lake.

Hill Creek was named after one Isaac Hill.

References

Rivers of Oregon
Rivers of Jackson County, Oregon